Chilostoma acrotricha is a species of medium-sized, air-breathing, land snail, a terrestrial pulmonate gastropod mollusk in the family Helicidae, the true snails. The species is endemic in France and Spain, and is currently Near threatened.

References

Chilostoma
Gastropods described in 1877